Boisea is the least speciose genus of the soapberry bug subfamily.  Members of this genus are found in North America, India, and Africa. Unlike other serinethine genera, the distribution of Boisea is very patchy; it is speculated that its highly vicariant range is relictual of what was previously a much vaster, continuous range. The most well-known species of this genus are the North American boxelder bugs (western Boisea rubrolineata and eastern Boisea trivittata) and African Boisea fulcrata. The US species mainly feed on the seeds of maple trees and are occasional nuisance pests around homes.

In North America, Boisea trivittata is native to most of the continental United States, excluding California. Boisea rubrolineata is native to western continental United States.

Exocrine secretions of these bugs have also been extensively studied.

References 

Pentatomomorpha genera
Hemiptera of North America
Serinethinae
Taxa named by George Willis Kirkaldy